"Taking a Chance on Love" is a popular song from the 1940 Broadway musical Cabin in the Sky. It was introduced by Ethel Waters playing the role of Petunia Jackson both on Broadway and later in the 1943 MGM musical  Cabin in the Sky. The song was written by Vernon Duke with lyrics by John La Touche and Ted Fetter (see 1940 in music). It has become a standard. Several songs from the Broadway musical were released as a 3-record shellac set under the title "The Music of Cabin in the Sky featuring Ethel Waters" in 1940.

Cover versions
Since the original recording, "Taking a Chance on Love" has become part of the American Songbook and has been sung and recorded by many prominent performers, including:
In 1943, a reissue of the Benny Goodman cover featuring Helen Forrest (which was recorded and previously released in 1940) reached No. 1, as well as reaching No. 10 on the Harlem Hit Parade chart. 
Sammy Kaye also enjoyed chart success in 1943, reaching the No. 13 position. 
Hazel Scott in the Vincente Minnelli 1943 film I Dood It
Frank Sinatra
Ella Fitzgerald
Tony Bennett

References

1940 songs
1943 singles
1940s jazz standards
1969 singles
Songs with lyrics by John La Touche (lyricist)
Songs with music by Vernon Duke
Benny Goodman songs
Songs from musicals
Pop standards
Ethel Waters songs